{{Infobox film
| name           = Gundaraj 
| native_name      = 
| image          = Gundaraj.jpg
| image_size     = 
| caption        = Release poster
| director       = Guddu Dhanoa
| producer       = Lalit Kapoor Raju Narula
| writer         = Anees Bazmee (dialogue)Robin Henry (screenplay)
| narrator       = 
| starring       = Ajay Devgn Kajol  Amrish Puri
| music          = Songs:Anu MalikBackground Score:Surinder Sodhi
| cinematography = Sripad Natu   
| editing        = V.N. Mayekar   
| studio         = Tridev Arts
| distributor    = Shemaroo Entertainment
| released       =  
| runtime        = 
| country        = India
| language       = Hindi
| budget         =  
| gross          =  
}}Gundaraj' (Rule of goons'') is a 1995 Bollywood action film directed by Guddu Dhanoa. It stars Ajay Devgn, Kajol and Amrish Puri. The film premiered on 8 September 1995 in Mumbai. The movie became a  commercial failure at the box office.

Synopsis
Ajay Chauhan lives with his parents and younger sister. He is in love with Pooja, and hopes to marry her someday. His father wants him to get a job and settle down, and then get married. Ajay applies for a job in Bombay, and soon receives a letter asking him to appear for an interview. He attends the interview, and is hired. Delighted to see all his dreams coming true, he goes to offer his thanks to God, and it is there a woman named Pratika Jetley sees him and notifies the police that he is indeed the one who had brutally raped three young women in a college campus. Ajay vehemently denies this, but is personally identified and criminally held responsible, convicted and sentenced to prison. Several years later he is released from prison, and finds out that his father and Pooja had committed suicide, his sister had become mentally ill while his mother was untraceable. He sets out to put his life together and meets with a ruthless police inspector, whose daughter was one of the rape victims. It is then Ajay finds out about the conspiracy behind this plot to frame him. A news reporter Ritu (Kajol) helps him track down the real culprits and bring them to justice. Meanwhile, Ajay and Ritu start getting attracted to each other and they fall in love. It is revealed that the real culprits are Deka, Manya and Raj Bahadur aka. Baba.

Cast

Ajay Devgan as Ajay Chauhan 
Kajol as Ritu 
Anjali Jathar as Pooja
Amrish Puri as Police Inspector 
G. Asrani as Gopal
Mohan Joshi as Raj Bahadur a.k.a. Baba
Mohnish Bahl as Manya 
Sharat Saxena as Deka 
Usha Nadkarni as Parvati Chauhan 
Achyut Potdar as Amit Chauhan 
Ahmed Khan (actor) as College Correspondent Jaitley
Sulabha Arya as Principal Pratika Jaitley
Madan Jain as Police Inspector Vijay Sharma
Kalpana Iyer as Public Prosecutor
Deven Verma as Ritu Boss Senior Journalist 
Janardhan Parab as Police Constable
Suresh Chatwal as Interviewer
Beena Banerjee as Judge wife
Shashi Sharma as young lady who is saved from being raped

Soundtrack
Lyrics: Rahat Indori, Zameer Kazmi, Zafar Gorakhpuri & Shyam Anuragi
Singers: Kumar Sanu, Alka Yagnik, Alisha Chinai, Sadhana Sargam & Bali Brahmabhatt
Music : Anu Malik

References

External links
 

1990s Hindi-language films
Indian action films
1995 films
1995 action films
Films scored by Surinder Sodhi
Films directed by Guddu Dhanoa